Halle-Buizingen was a women's one-day cycle race which took place in Belgium and was rated initially as a National Event,  but later ranked by the UCI as 1.2.

Previous winners

References

Cycle races in Belgium
Women's road bicycle races
Defunct cycling races in Belgium